Lorne Elias is a Canadian chemist, inventor, and a pioneer in explosives detection technology. He invented the explosives vapour detector, EVD-1, a portable bomb detection instrument deployed at international airports in Canada in the 1980s. He contributed to the field of explosives detection for over three decades, and is called the father of vapour and trace explosives detection technology.

Education 

Lorne Elias obtained a bachelor of science in chemistry from Carleton University in 1952. He received a PhD in physical chemistry under the direction of H. Schiff from McGill University in 1956.

Career and research 
Elias conducted research on trace organic analyses at National Research Council Canada, from pesticides to narcotics and explosives. He invented the portable suitcase-sized explosives vapour detector, EVD-1, and the Trace Narcotics Detector. EVD-1 was based on gas chromatography with electron capture detector, and the Trace Narcotics Detector was based on gas chromatography with nitrogen-phosphorus detector. EVD-1 was the first portable bomb detection instrument in Canada, one of the 100 notable innovations from National Research Council Canada, and one of 50 Greatest Canadian Inventions. EVD-1 was capable of detecting minute amounts of dynamite, other explosives, and 2,3-Dimethyl-2,3-dinitrobutane (DMNB, a taggant or marker in plastic explosives). EVD-1 was deployed during the papal visit in 1984 and alarmed on a luggage of Pope John Paul II, due to a revolver in the luggage packed by bodyguards. Similarly, the EVD-1 detected signatures of black powder from the revolver of a security guard during President Reagan's visit to Canada. The EVD-1 technology was transferred from National Research Council Canada to industry, and units of EVD-1 were deployed at international airports in Canada after the 1985 Air India bombing. Elias, a pioneer who shaped the development of explosives detection technology deployed today, is called the father of vapour and trace explosives detection technology.

Elias was part of the International Civil Aviation Organization Ad Hoc Group of Specialists on the Detection of Explosives.  He contributed in the development and evaluation of the ICAO detection markers for plastic explosives, which led to the Convention on the Marking of Plastic Explosives for the Purpose of Detection. He studied the permeability of detection markers (DMNB, ethylene glycol dinitrate EGDN, ortho-mononitrotoluene o-MNT and para-mononitrotoluene p-MNT) through various materials and their vapour pressures, and conducted research in encapsulating DMNB in order to extend the shelf life. 

He retired from National Research Council Canada after 35 years, and continued with explosives detection research as a private consultant (JenEl TVD Research and Consulting Inc) for a number of government departments, including the U.S. Federal Aviation Administration, Transport Canada, and the Canadian Explosives Research Laboratory of Natural Resources Canada.

Selected publications 

Journal Articles

 
 
 
 
 
 
 
 

Book Chapters

 
 
 
Conference Proceedings

Patents 

 Concentrator for Detection of Amine Vapors (1987) US 4,701,306A 
 Trace vapor concentrator (1987) US 4,698,071A 
 Method and Apparatus for the Introduction of a Vaporizable Sample into an Analytical Test Apparatus (1988) US 4,732,046A 
 Sorbent Tube Trace Sample Releasing Apparatus (1990) US 4,890,502A 
 Trace vapour concentrator (1990) CA 1,266,621A 
 Method for Testing the Freshness of Fish (1990) US 4,980,294A 
 Method of determining wood species (1991) CA 2,009,062A1 
 Thermally-Releasable-Sample Collecting Device (1993) US 5,181,427A 
 Method and apparatus for the detection of a hidden element exuding vapor (2001) WO2001092850A1

References 

McGill University alumni
Carleton University alumni
Canadian inventors
Canadian chemists

Living people

Year of birth missing (living people)